Tere Veronica Rapley  (born 1973), generally known as Teremoana Rapley, is a New Zealand musician, television presenter and television producer, best known for her work in the 1990s with Upper Hutt Posse and Moana and the Moahunters. 

In the 2021 Queen's Birthday Honours, Rapley was appointed a Member of the New Zealand Order of Merit, for services to music and television.

History 
Rapley joined hip hop group Upper Hutt Posse in 1987, aged 14. She sang on the group's early tracks, including "Stormy Weather" and "Ragga Girl" and featured on the group's 1989 album Against the Flow.

In 1989 Rapley joined Moana Maniapoto's hip hop and pop trio Moana and the Moahunters. The group released two albums, Tahi and Rua and had chart success with many singles, including "Black Pearl", "A.E.I.O.U." and "Peace, Love & Family". Rapley's work with Moana and the Moahunters saw her awarded Most Promising Female Vocalist at the 1992 New Zealand Music Awards. Rapley describes herself as having "voluntarily pulled out of mainstream media with her music after realising that the industry is based on looks and not artistry."

In the 1990s Rapley also provided guest vocals on tracks from other artists, including "Sitting by the Telephone" by Unitone Hi Fi, "Body Rhymes (Protect Yourself)" by MC OJ and Rhythm Slave, "Horified One" by Dam Native and "In Summer" by David Parker.

In 1995 Rapley turned her attentions to a solo career, releasing the singles "Beautiful People" and a cover of the Nina Simone song "Four Women", and was awarded Best Female Vocalist at the 1996 New Zealand Music Awards.

Rapley continued to work from her home studio she had set up since 1992 that started with a Fostex 4-track cassette recorder and Dr.T's music software on Atari 1040ST. She has composed title music for television programmes, commercial music work for Air NZ and Coca-Cola as well as working on tracks for her upcoming album.

Rapley has worked with Bill Urale King Kapisi. She has featured on his singles "Saboteur" and "Lollipop". Teremoana and King Kapisi used to run The Plantation Store, which included Kapisi’ Overstayer clothing range.

Rapley is also known for her television presenting work. In 1995 she joined long-running New Zealand children's television show What Now as a field reporter. From 1996 to 2001, Teremoana was a presenter on TV2's Maori youth magazine programme Mai Time.

After the birth of her fourth and youngest child, she moved permanently behind the camera holding many roles including director, camera operator, editor, scriptwriter, production manager and producer. In 2015, after 10 years of service, Rapley resigned as a producer at the Maori Television Service in Auckland, New Zealand having produced over 1400 television programmes for the station and gained over 3000 production credits to her name.

Discography

Singles

As featured artist

See also

Awards 

|-
| 1989
| Upper Hutt Posse
| 1989 New Zealand Music Awards – Most Promising Group
| 
|-
| 1992
| Teremoana Rapley (Moana and the Moahunters)
| 1992 New Zealand Music Awards – Most Promising Female Vocalist
| 
|-
| 1996
| "Give it Up Now" (Moana and the Moahunters)
| 1996 New Zealand Music Awards – Best Mana Maori Album
| 
|-
| 1996
| "Akona Te Reo '95" (Moana and the Moahunters)
| 1996 New Zealand Music Awards – Best Mana Reo Album
| 
|-
| 1996
| Teremoana Rapley
| 1996 New Zealand Music Awards – Best Female Vocalist
| 
|-
| 2014
| Teremoana Rapley
| 2014 Tangireka Music Awards – Cook Islander in Mainstream
| 
|}

References

External links 
 
 Facebook page
 Twitter account
 
 Dub Dot Dash interview
 Unsung Heroes Episode on Teremoana Rapley

New Zealand rappers
21st-century New Zealand women singers
1973 births
20th-century New Zealand women singers
People from Upper Hutt
Living people
New Zealand women television presenters
Members of the New Zealand Order of Merit